Dachshund, plank, or mrówkowiec is a multi-family residential house located at Kijowska 11 street in the Praga-Północ district of Warsaw.

Description 
It was built in the years 1971–1973 in the southern part of the Szmulowizna area, facing PKP Warszawa Wschodnia train station in Warsaw. The building, designed by Jan Kalinowski was applauded by journalists when it was opened to first residents. Despite its length, the building contains very small apartments and is plagued by noise from the busy street and train station nearby.

The building has 430 apartments, 132 garages, and as of 2008 it was inhabited by over 1200 residents. The building contains 43 staircases, every staircase serves about 10 apartments, only two on each floor.

In order to break the monotony of this building commercial center-pavilions in a comb shape where planned, but never built.

Due to the extreme length of the building, already at the construction stage, the problem of walls breaking appeared and settling of the building appeared. On the old plaster the glass decorative elements can be observed. Their break was to be recognized as signal for building settling in the ground.

The building is considered to be the longest block of apartments in Warsaw.

See also 

 House types
 Falowiec

References 

Praga-Północ